Inga Dauškāne (born 12 April 1980) is a Latvian cross-country skier. She competed at the FIS Nordic World Ski Championships 2011 in Oslo, the FIS Nordic World Ski Championships 2013 in Val di Fiemme, and at the 2014 Winter Olympics in Sochi.

References

External links

 
 
 
 

1980 births
Living people
Cross-country skiers at the 2014 Winter Olympics
Latvian female cross-country skiers
Olympic cross-country skiers of Latvia
21st-century Latvian women